Junk Jet is a non-commercial publication platform, a collaborative format set up to discuss speculative works on topics of art, architecture and electronic media. It is published by independent igmade.edition, edited and designed by Mona Mahall and Asli Serbest (m-a-u-s-e-r).

History 
Self-published Magazine Junk Jet is founded in 2007 by Mona Mahall and Asli Serbest. It tries to introduce "noise to signal".

Issues 

Junk Jet n°1
noise-and-failure-issue
The editors write in the first issue:

JJ wants to capture and transfer junk’s ambiguities indicating non- function, or at least bad-function implied in the nature of technology, and various forms of mis-use for aesthetic purposes. What could be the aesthetic (non-) function of junk within clean computational aesthetics of electronic media?
Therefore, relevant fields are all sorts of re-use, of wrong- and non-use, and of tinkering (bricoler, basteln) of forms and found objects, of theories and (small) narratives, of fashions and styles, and of course of computers and other electronic devices.
Release Date: November 2007
ISBN: NO-ISBN
Number of pages: 69 
Measurements: 25 x 20 x 0.5 cm

Junk Jet n°2
the-speculative-issue
The editors write in the second issue:
For the second issue, Junk Jet was looking for the Speculative, focussing on works of unpredictable architectures and volatile spaces within real and virtual environments.
The speculative haunts all systems of production, threatens them with the destruction of their order and with collapse. It continues to appear to all orthodoxies as artifice, as a black magic, which is to be unveiled, because it is somehow effective in an illusive, but absorbing way, which is characteristic to an occasion for a game and its stakes. It is not a rational process, but something that contradicts this frame, something that is recognized as irrational, as feverish, and that therefore is suspected to be dysfunctional, inhuman, or even monstrous.
Release Date: November 2008
ISBN: NO-ISBN
Number of pages: 100 
Measurements: 24 x 16.5 x 0.7 cm

Junk Jet n°3
flux-us-flux-you-issue
The editors write in the third issue:
Junk Jet n°3 asked for fluxing architectures, boogie, buildings, rolling rocks, flying architectures, provisory pyramids, and temporary eternities; for all kinds of practical concepts and conceptual practices, for stable happenings and unstable thoughts, for lifted cellars and dugin landmarks, for curtains, mobiles, house boats, bubbles, zeppelins, flying saucers ...
Release Date: February 2010

Number of pages: 120 
Measurements: 18 x 13 x 1 cm

Junk Jet n°4
statistics-of-mystics-issue
The fourth issue is about:
works and theories that make 1 become 2, 2 become 3, 3 …, works that make something out of nothing or nothing out of something, that discover new – even if microscaled – galaxies, that believe in alchemy and maintain a certain kind of apocalyptic thought; works that move from mumbo-jumbo to real magic and back.
Release Date: October 2010

Number of pages: 88 
Measurements: 27 x 19 x 1 cm

Junk Jet n°5
The net.heart-issue, released in 2012, transfers internet things from their digital space into printed media. It reflects the current internet culture with contributions by young internet artist and thinkers. It is an archive impossible with reflecting net.heart of internet culture. It collects objects, internet blogs, and animations from internet and turns them into a magazine. Editors Mona Mahall and Asli Serbest are inspired by the process of collecting objects and documenting archival material.

Junk Jet n°6
Here and Where Issue, n°6 is about the local in the global culture. It takes the attitude that the global is just the local on world tour. The local is not preserving identity – be that cultural, political, or social – but it is (re)inventing itself as art, activism and enterprise. The local aims at becoming a global subject, without knowing what forces (swarm, viral, etc.) this depends on. There is a downloadable hidden track in the magazine.

References

 m-a-u-s-e-r
 igmade.edition
 Review by Triangulation Blog
 Rhizome Review of Junk Jet n°2 by  Ceci Moss 
 Serial Consign Review of Junk Jet n°2 by Greg J. Smith
 Strange Harvest Review
 Super Colossal Review of Junk Jet n°2 by Marcus Trimble
 Loud Paper Review of Junk Jet n°2 by Mimi Zeiger
 Rhizome Review of Junk Jet n°1 by Marisa Olson
 Life Without Buildings Review
 Burak Arikan Article

External links
 

2007 establishments in Germany
Architecture magazines
Design magazines
Fanzines
Visual arts magazines published in Germany
Irregularly published magazines published in Germany
Magazines established in 2007
Mass media in Stuttgart
New media
Zines